This is a list of episodes for the Disney Channel original series Shake It Up, which premiered on November 7, 2010 and ended on November 10, 2013. The series follows two best friends, CeCe Jones and Rocky Blue (portrayed by Bella Thorne and Zendaya respectively), who land their dream job as back-up dancers on the television show, Shake It Up, Chicago. The show follows their adventures in the show and features problems and issues such as their new social status, tests their friendships and rivals on the show. The show's third season premiered on October 14, 2012. In July 2013, Disney Channel announced that Shake It Up would end after its third season.

Series overview

Episodes

Season 1 (2010–11)

Season 2 (2011–12)

Season 3 (2012–13)

References

External links
 
 
 

 
Lists of American sitcom episodes
Lists of American children's television series episodes
Lists of Disney Channel television series episodes